Roatta is an Italian surname.

Geographical distribution
As of 2014, 34.3% of all known bearers of the surname Roatta were residents of France (frequency 1:240,969), 33.7% of Italy (1:225,589), 26.3% of Argentina (1:201,620), 2.2% of the United States (1:20,069,515) and 2.0% of Brazil (1:12,782,012).

In Italy, the frequency of the surname was higher than national average (1:225,589) in the following regions:
 1. Piedmont (1:21,281)
 2. Liguria (1:28,704)

In Argentina, the frequency of the surname was higher than national average (1:201,620) in the following provinces:
 1. Santa Fe Province (1:38,558)
 2. Córdoba Province (1:42,842)
 3. Mendoza Province (1:168,800)
 4. Catamarca Province (1:197,372)

In France, the frequency of the surname was higher than national average (1:240,969) only in one region: Provence-Alpes-Côte d'Azur (1:22,113).

People
 Jean Roatta, French politician
 Mario Roatta, Italian general

References

Italian-language surnames